Songs from the Heart is the fourth studio album by Australian tenor, Mark Vincent. The album was released through Sony Music Australia on 14 October 2011 and peaked at number 10 on the ARIA Charts.

"Songs From The Heart" is a special selection of songs dedicated to commemorate the 20th anniversary of the death of Dr. Victor Chang.

Reviews
Jon O'Brien from AllMusic gave the album 3 out of 5 saying; "Alongside the usual film themes, traditional standards and timeless pop hits, Vincent has chosen a slightly less predictable array of songs, at least proving to his naysayers that there is some sign of progression" concluding with "While British counterpart Paul Potts appears to have been all but forgotten, Songs from the Heart suggests that Mark Vincent has the guile to extend his reality TV-assisted fame once he's outside his teens."

Track listing
 CD/DD
 "You're Still You" - 3:41
 "Amazing Grace" - 3:58
 "Non ti scordar di me" - 3:07
 "'Til I Hear You Sing" - 3:20
 "Young At Heart" - 2:48
 "Wishing You Were Somehow Here Again" - 3:48
 "Climb Every Mountain" - 2:36
 "Cavatina" - 3:54
 "If Ever I Would Leave You" - 3:53
 "Bridge over Troubled Water" - 3:59
 "Mi Manchi" - 3:37
 "Forever and Ever" - 3:47
 "Once Before I Go On" - 4:22
 "My Heart Will Go On" - 4:26

Charts

Weekly charts

Year-end charts

Release history

External links
 "Songs from the Heart" by Mark Vincent

References

2011 albums
Mark Vincent albums
Sony Music Australia albums